Macalester College Observatory  is an astronomical observatory owned and operated by Macalester College in Saint Paul, Minnesota, United States.

See also 
List of astronomical observatories

References

External links
Macalester College Observatory
St Paul Clear Sky Clock Forecasts of observing conditions covering Macalester College Observatory.

Astronomical observatories in Minnesota
Buildings and structures in Saint Paul, Minnesota
Macalester College